This is the list of the episodes of Paris by Night, a Vietnamese-language musical variety show. Due to the way releases are made available on VHS, DVD, and Blu-ray, many release dates cannot be determined precisely.

List of Paris by Night shows

References 

 
Paris by Night